A browser speed test is a computer benchmark that scores the performance of a web browser, by measuring the browser's efficiency in completing a predefined list of tasks. In general the testing software is available online, located on a website, where different algorithms are loaded and performed in the browser client. Typical test tasks are rendering and animation, DOM transformations, string operations, mathematical calculations, sorting algorithms, graphic performance tests and memory instructions.
Browser speed tests have been used during browser wars to prove superiority of specific web browsers. The popular Acid3 test is no particular speed test but checks browser conformity to web standards (though it checks whether a general performance goal is met).

General tests

Speedometer 2.0
Speedometer was originally developed by the WebKit team at Apple and released in 2014 and was updated in 2018. Speedometer 2.0 tests a browser's Web app responsiveness by timing simulated user interactions.

This benchmark simulates user actions for adding, completing, and removing to-do items using multiple examples in TodoMVC. Each example in TodoMVC implements the same todo application using DOM APIs in different ways. Some call DOM APIs directly from ECMAScript 5 (ES5), ECMASCript 2015 (ES6), ES6 transpiled to ES5, and Elm transpiled to ES5. Others use one of eleven popular JavaScript frameworks: React, React with Redux, Ember.js, Backbone.js, AngularJS, (new) Angular, Vue.js, jQuery, Preact, Inferno, and Flight. Many of these frameworks are used on the most popular websites in the world, such as Facebook and Twitter. The performance of these types of operations depends on the speed of the DOM APIs, the JavaScript engine, CSS style resolution, layout, and other technologies.

Peacekeeper
Peacekeeper is a platform-independent benchmark by Futuremark that tests rendering, mathematical and memory operations. It takes approx. 5 minutes for execution and tells the results of other browsers with different CPUs. Futuremark stopped maintaining Peacekeeper in July 2015. The test was taken offline in March 2018 and is no longer available.

Speed-Battle
Test of a JavaScript engine using simple algorithms. It displays results of other visitors (best, average, poorest) with the same operating system and browser version. It has an additional statistics page with browser ranking.

Testdrive
Microsoft maintains a suite of performance-oriented tests, often designed to test and stress JavaScript and rendering performance. These tests are typically designed to highlight IE's performance, but are compatible with other major browsers.

WebXPRT
WebXPRT is a cross-platform browser benchmark that runs HTML5- and JavaScript-based workloads. The benchmark provides scores for six individual workloads, as well as an overall score. WebXPRT is published by the BenchmarkXPRT Development Community, which is administered by Principled Technologies, and is one of the BenchmarkXPRT benchmarks. WebXPRT 3 is the most current version of WebXPRT.

3D tests

Wirple BMark 
Performance test for HTML5 3D applications. It tests performance in both Canvas3D and WebGL.

Developer suites

Mozilla benchmarks

Dromaeo (superseded by Kraken)
A Mozilla test suite based on SunSpider tests. It takes several minutes for execution and displays very detailed information about every single test task.

Kraken (active)
Another JavaScript test suite from Mozilla, released September 14, 2010.

Apple benchmarks

JetStream (active)
A JavaScript test suite developed by Apple.

SunSpider (superseded)
SunSpider is a benchmark created by the webkit team that aims to measure JavaScript performance on tasks relevant to the current and near future use of JavaScript in the real world, such as encryption and text manipulation. The suite further attempts to be balanced and statistically sound.

Version 0.9 was released by the WebKit team in December 2007. It was well-received, and other browser developers also use it to compare the JavaScript performance of different browsers.

Version 0.9.1 was released in April 2010.

Version 1.0 was released in April 2013.

Google benchmarks

V8 (superseded)
A JavaScript test suite by Google, used to optimize the Google Chrome web browser. It does not test rendering performance. It was superseded by Google's Octane benchmark.

Octane (unmaintained) 
Google's JavaScript test suite which replaces the V8 benchmark. According to Google, "Octane v.1 consists of 13 tests, 5 new ones and 8 from the original V8 Benchmark Suite." Octane v.2 supplanted v.1, consisting of "17 tests, four more than Octane v1."

As of April 12 2017, Google no longer maintains Octane.

GUIMark 2
This tests vector, bitmap, and text rendering for both Adobe Flash and HTML5.

References

Benchmarks (computing)
Benchmarks
Computer performance
Software optimization
Web browsers